Alexander Roger Beam (November 21, 1869 – April 17, 1938) was a Major League Baseball pitcher. He started and completed two games for the Pittsburgh Alleghenys in 1889, going 1-1. He then played in the minor leagues until 1892.

References

1869 births
1938 deaths
Major League Baseball pitchers
Baseball players from Pennsylvania
Pittsburgh Alleghenys players
19th-century baseball players
Burlington Babies players
Altoona Mountaineers players
Lead City Grays players
Green Bay Bays players